మునిపల్లి గ్రామం తెలంగాణ రాష్ట్రంలో నిజామాబాద్ జిల్లాలో జక్రాన్పల్లి మండలం నందు కలదు. ఈ గ్రామం జాతీయ రహదారి 16 నిజామాబాద్  నుండి ఆర్మూర్ వెళ్లే దారిలో2 కిలోమీటర్లు దూరంలో మరియు జాతీయ రహదారి 44 అర్గుల్ నుండి ఏడు కిలోమీటర్ల దూరంలో ఉండును. గ్రామం ప్రధానంగా వ్యవసాయంపై పాడి పశువులపై ఆధారపడినది. ఈ గ్రామంలో సుమారు 6000 జనాభా కలదు. ఈ గ్రామానికి ఇప్పుడు అనగా 2018 నుంచి ముస్కు సాయిరెడ్డి సర్పంచుగా మరియు తిరుపతి రెడ్డి ఎంపీటీసీగా ఉండడం జరిగింది ఈ గ్రామంలో చుట్టుపక్కల గ్రామాలకి ఆదర్శంగా నిలుస్తూ వ్యవసాయం చేయడం జరుగుతుంది. ప్రధానంగా ఇక్కడ పసుపు మొక్కజొన్న ఎర్ర జొన్న సజ్జలు పండించడం జరుగుతుంది. అన్ని రకాలకూరగాయ పంటలు పండిస్తూ ఎంతో ఆర్థికంగా అభివృద్ధి చెందిన గ్రామము

 

Villages in Nizamabad district